Munich-Daglfing is a Munich S-Bahn railway station in the borough of Bogenhausen. Close to the station  is the Zamilapark.

References

Daglfing
Daglfing
Railway stations in Germany opened in 1909